Nosratabad (also Romanized as Noșratābād) is a city in Nosratabad District, Zahedan County, Sistan and Baluchestan province, Iran. At the 2006 census, its population was 4,182, in 919 families.

Nosratabad lies on the road from Zahedan to Bam.

History
Nosratabad, the city of Nosrat, was named after Nusret el Mulk, a former deputy governor of Sistan; when built, c. 1870, it was first called Nasirabad in honour of Nasr-uddin Shah; other names, used locally, are Shahr-i-Seistan, Shahr-i-Nassiriyeh, or simply Shahr (the town). Its climate is very dry and hot; due to its location in the Lut Desert, it is among the hottest locations in the world. In August 1926, the highest officially recorded temperature soared to 58.0 °C.

During the late nineteenth century it was the residence of British and Russian consuls, and had post and telegraph offices (as of 1911). The city served as the capital of Sistan until some time in the 20th Century.

On 3 June 2009, the Jondollah militant group blocked off roads between Nosratabad and Bam, seizing several trucks.

References

 

Populated places in Zahedan County
Cities in Sistan and Baluchestan Province